Crossings is an album by pianist Red Garland, bassist Ron Carter and drummer Philly Joe Jones which was recorded in late 1977 and released on the Galaxy label in the following year.

Reception

The AllMusic review by Scott Yanow stated "Amazingly enough, this set was the first time that pianist Red Garland and drummer Philly Joe Jones recorded together in a trio setting, even though they had both been a part of Miles Davis' first classic quintet. ... This is one of Garland's best later dates".

Track listing
 "Solar" (Miles Davis) – 5:07
 "Railroad Crossing" (Ron Carter) – 5:21
 "Never Let Me Go" (Ray Evans, Jay Livingston) – 5:15
 "Oleo" (Sonny Rollins) – 5:15
 "But Not for Me" (George Gershwin, Ira Gershwin) – 7:00
 "Love for Sale" (Cole Porter) – 11:26

Personnel
Red Garland – piano
Ron Carter – bass
Philly Joe Jones – drums

References

Galaxy Records albums
Red Garland albums
1978 albums
Albums produced by Orrin Keepnews